The 2009 Copa del Rey Final was the 107th final of the Spanish cup competition, the Copa del Rey (including two seasons where two rival editions were played). The final was played at Mestalla in Valencia on 13 May 2009. The match was won by FC Barcelona, who beat Athletic Bilbao 4–1. This was the first title of Barcelona that year, before winning La Liga and the UEFA Champions League to earn their first treble.

Road to the final

Match details

Anthem controversy
The pre-match playing of Spain's national anthem prompted widespread booing from Catalan nationalist fans of FC Barcelona and Basque nationalist fans of Athletic Bilbao. Televisión Española (TVE) cut away from its coverage as soon as this started and consequently did not show the playing of the anthem live, instead showing it at half time with the booing edited out. Afterwards, its director Javier Pons apologised for the "mistake", and Julian Reyes, the head of sports news, was fired as a result of the censorship.

See also
Athletic–Barcelona clásico

References

External links
AS.com 

2009
1
FC Barcelona matches
Athletic Bilbao matches
21st century in Valencia